This is a list of settlements in the province of North Holland, in the Netherlands.

Sources 
 GEOnet Names Server (GNS)

 
North Holland